Sergey Ivanovich Vavilov ( ( – January 25, 1951) was a Soviet physicist, the President of the Academy of Sciences of the Soviet Union from July 1945 until his death. His elder brother Nikolai Vavilov was a famous Russian geneticist.

Biography
Vavilov founded the Soviet school of physical optics, known by his works in luminescence. In 1934 he co-discovered the Vavilov-Cherenkov effect, a discovery for which Pavel Cherenkov was awarded a Nobel Prize in Physics in 1958. The Kasha–Vavilov rule of luminescence quantum yields is also named for him.

He was a member of the USSR Academy of Sciences from 1932, Head of the Lebedev Institute of Physics (since 1934), a chief editor of the Great Soviet Encyclopedia, a member of the Supreme Soviet from 1946 and a recipient of four Stalin Prizes (1943, 1946, 1951, 1952).

He wrote on the lives and works of great thinkers, such as Lucretius, Galileo Galilei, Isaac Newton, Mikhail Lomonosov, Michael Faraday, and Pyotr Lebedev, among others.

At the end of 1950, Vavilov's health who was suffering from heart and lung diseases deteriorated significantly. In December-January he was treated at the Barvikha Sanatorium. Returning from the sanatorium on January 12, 1951, he chaired an expanded meeting of the Presidium of the Academy of Sciences. On January 25, 1951, at 4:45 a.m., he died of a myocardial infarction.

Legacy
A meteorological station (as well as a glacier and an ice cap) in October Revolution Island, in the Severnaya Zemlya group have been named after Vavilov. A minor planet 2862 Vavilov discovered in 1977 by Soviet astronomer Nikolai Chernykh is named after him and his brother Nikolai Vavilov. The crater Vavilov on the far side of the Moon is also named after him and his brother. 

There is a ship named after him, the Akademik Sergey Vavilov. She is a research vessel that can carry approximately 150 crew and passengers, and is a Class-1A icebreaker which regularly makes trips to Antarctica and the Arctic. In the summer of 2010 she was working in and around the coast of Svalbard. Also, an Aeroflot plane, with VO-BHL identification number is named after him.

References

 М. Борисов, "Изследванията на С. И. Вавилов върху физиката на луминесцентните явления", Научно-популярна сесия в памет на акад. Сергей Иванович Вавилов (17 – 18.10.1951), София, Изд. БАН, с. 39–77 (1954)
 Н. Ахабабян, Сергей Иванович Вавилов (по случай 100 години от рождението му), Светът на физиката, кн. 1, с. 30–35 (1991)
 Л. Спасов, Г. Камишева, Милко Борисов за себе си и другите за него, София, Акад. изд. "Проф. М. Дринов" (2008) с. 183

External links
Sergei Vavilov: luminary of Russian physics

1891 births
1951 deaths
20th-century Russian physicists
Academic staff of Bauman Moscow State Technical University
Foreign Members of the Bulgarian Academy of Sciences
Full Members of the USSR Academy of Sciences
ITMO University
Members of the German Academy of Sciences at Berlin
Foreign members of the Serbian Academy of Sciences and Arts
Academic staff of the Moscow Institute of Physics and Technology
Moscow State University alumni
Academic staff of Moscow State University
Academic staff of Moscow Power Engineering Institute
Presidents of the Russian Academy of Sciences
Presidents of the USSR Academy of Sciences
Second convocation members of the Supreme Soviet of the Soviet Union
Third convocation members of the Supreme Soviet of the Soviet Union
Stalin Prize winners
Recipients of the Order of Lenin
Recipients of the Order of the Red Banner of Labour
Russian military personnel of World War I
Russian physicists
Soviet physicists
Burials at Novodevichy Cemetery
Proceedings of the USSR Academy of Sciences editors